Stuart-Wortley is the name of
James Stuart-Wortley-Mackenzie (1747–1818), British politician and soldier
John Stuart-Wortley (1773–1797), British politician
John Stuart-Wortley-Mackenzie, 2nd Baron Wharncliffe (1801-1855), British politician
Archibald Stuart-Wortley (disambiguation), multiple individuals
Lady Emmeline Stuart-Wortley-Mackenzie (1806–1855), British writer
Edward Montagu-Stuart-Wortley-Mackenzie, 1st Earl of Wharncliffe (1827-1899), British railway executive
Victoria Alexandrina Stuart-Wortley-Mackenzie (1837–1912), British philosopher
Charles Stuart-Wortley, 1st Baron Stuart of Wortley (1851–1926), English statesman
Edward James Montagu-Stuart-Wortley (1857-1934), British general 
James Stuart-Wortley (disambiguation), multiple individuals
Charles Stuart-Wortley-Mackenzie (1802–1844), British politician